Sowt Alasema FM (Arabic: اذاعة صوت العاصمة) is an Iraqi  public radio station but mainly an Arabic-speaking station, broadcasting in many locations throughout the Middle East on AM and FM from Baghdad. It was founded in 2008.

History
Radio Sowt Alasema started broadcasting in 2008, and was created by Amanat Baghdad.

References

2008 establishments in Iraq
Arabic-language radio stations
Radio in Iraq
Radio stations established in 2008
Mass media in Baghdad
Mass media in Iraq